The  was an electric multiple unit (EMU) train type operated by the private railway operator Izuhakone Railway on its Sunzu Line in Japan from 1989 until 2012.

The 1100 series was converted from former Seibu 701 series EMUs.

The last remaining set, 1009, was withdrawn from service in June 2012.

Formation
Sets were formed as follows.

The M car was fitted with two pantographs.

References

Train-related introductions in 1989
Electric multiple units of Japan
Izuhakone Sunzu Line